FC Basel Frauen is a women's football team of the club FC Basel from Basel, Switzerland. It competes in the Nationalliga A.

They finished second in the 2017–18 season and made their European debut in the 2018–19 UEFA Women's Champions League.

Titles
 Swiss Women's Cup winner: 1 (2014)

Players

Current squad

Former players
For details of current and former players, see :Category:FC Basel Frauen players.

Coaching staff

References

External links
Official Website
Facebook page

Frauen FC Basel
Women's football clubs in Switzerland
2009 establishments in Switzerland